Lewis Highsmith Farm, also known as Sweet Liberty, is a historic home and farm complex located near Harrells, Sampson County, North Carolina.   The house was built about 1840, and is a large two-story, double pile, Federal style frame dwelling with a gable roof. The front facade features a full-width, two-tier front porch. The interior follows a hall-and-parlor plan.  Also on the property are the contributing log smokehouse, the former kitchen, the gable roofed barn, and a nearby cluster of four tobacco barns.

It was added to the National Register of Historic Places in 1986.

References

Farms on the National Register of Historic Places in North Carolina
Federal architecture in North Carolina
Houses completed in 1840
Buildings and structures in Sampson County, North Carolina
National Register of Historic Places in Sampson County, North Carolina